Gil Vicente Martínez (born January 26, 1956, in Torrevieja) is a Spanish actor, best known for his role in the short film Timecode (2016) and the Amazon Prime Video series El pueblo (2019).
>

References 

1956 births
Living people
Spanish actors